In electronics, a local oscillator (LO) is an electronic oscillator used with a mixer  to change the frequency of a signal. This frequency conversion process, also called  heterodyning, produces the sum and difference frequencies from the frequency of the local oscillator and frequency of the input signal. Processing a signal at a fixed frequency gives a radio receiver improved performance.
In many receivers, the function of local oscillator and mixer is combined in one stage called a "converter" - this reduces the space, cost, and power consumption by combining both functions into one active device.

Applications
Local oscillators are used in the superheterodyne receiver, the most common type of radio receiver circuit.  They are also used in many other communications circuits such as modems, cable television set top boxes, frequency division multiplexing systems used in telephone trunklines, microwave relay systems, telemetry systems, atomic clocks, radio telescopes, and military electronic countermeasure (antijamming) systems.
In satellite television reception, the microwave frequencies used from the satellite down to the receiving antenna are converted to lower frequencies by a local oscillator and mixer mounted at the antenna.  This allows the received signals to be sent over a length of cable that would otherwise have unacceptable signal loss at the original reception frequency.  In this application, the local oscillator is of a fixed frequency and the down-converted signal frequency is variable.

Performance requirements
Application of local oscillators in a receiver design requires care to ensure no spurious signals are radiated. Such signals can cause interference in the operation of other receivers.
The performance of a signal processing system depends on the characteristics of the local oscillator. The local oscillator must produce a stable frequency with low harmonics.  Stability must take into account temperature, voltage, and mechanical drift as factors. The oscillator must produce enough output power to effectively drive subsequent stages of circuitry, such as mixers or frequency multipliers. It must have low phase noise where the timing of the signal is critical. In a channelized receiver system, the precision of tuning of the frequency synthesizer must be compatible with the channel spacing of the desired signals.

Types of LO
A crystal oscillator is one common type of local oscillator that provides good stability and performance at relatively low cost, but its frequency is fixed, so changing frequencies requires changing the crystal. Tuning to different frequencies requires a variable-frequency oscillator which leads to a compromise between stability and tunability. With the advent of high-speed digital microelectronics, modern systems can use frequency synthesizers to obtain a stable tunable local oscillator, but care must still be taken to maintain adequate noise characteristics in the result.

Unintended LO emissions
Detection of local oscillator radiation may disclose the presence of the receiver, such as in detection of automotive radar detectors,  or detection of unlicensed television broadcast receivers in some countries. During World War II, Allied soldiers were not allowed to have superheterodyne receivers because the Axis soldiers had equipment which could detect the local oscillator emissions. This led to soldiers creating what is now known as a foxhole radio, a simple improvised radio receiver which has no local oscillator.

See also 
 Direct conversion receiver
 Homodyne detection
 Heterodyne detection
 Optical heterodyne detection
 NE612, oscillator and a Gilbert cell multiplier mixer.

References

Electronic oscillators
Radio electronics
Feedback